Irma is an unincorporated community located in Lincoln County, Wisconsin, United States. Irma has a post office with ZIP code 54442.

Notable people
Einar H. Ingman, Jr., Medal of Honor recipient, lived in Irma.

References

Unincorporated communities in Lincoln County, Wisconsin
Unincorporated communities in Wisconsin